In gynecology, a Rokitansky nodule is a mass or lump in an ovarian teratomatous cyst.

See also
Baron Carl von Rokitansky
Rokitansky-Aschoff sinuses

References

External links
 Image of a Rokitansky nodule - geocities.com

Gynaecologic disorders